Lutilabria prolata is a moth of the family Gelechiidae. It is found in Russia (the southern Ural) and Romania. The habitat consists of steppe.

The wingspan is about 18.5 mm. The forewings are unicolorous dark fuscous. The hindwings are fuscous. Adults are on wing in late May and early June.

Etymology
The species name is derived from Latin prolatus (meaning elongated) and refers to the elongated forewings and labial palps.

References

Moths described in 2010
Lutilabria